Miguel Ángel Perez Tello (born October 2, 1957, in Granada) is a skier and bicyclist from Spain. He cannot use part of one leg. He is a type LC3 bicycle athlete.  He raced at the 1988 Winter Paralympics in para-Nordic skiing. He was the second skier in the 10 km race and the second skier in the 2.5 km race. He raced at the 1992 Winter Paralympics in para-Nordic skiing.  He was the second skier in the 2.5 km race. He raced at the 1996 Summer Paralympics on a bicycle. He was the fastest to go Omnium Track race.

References 

Spanish male cross-country skiers
Spanish male cyclists
Living people
1957 births
Paralympic gold medalists for Spain
Paralympic silver medalists for Spain
Sportspeople from Granada
Cross-country skiers at the 1988 Winter Paralympics
Cross-country skiers at the 1992 Winter Paralympics
Cyclists at the 1996 Summer Paralympics
Medalists at the 1992 Winter Paralympics
Medalists at the 1988 Winter Paralympics
Paralympic medalists in cross-country skiing
Paralympic cyclists of Spain
Cyclists from Andalusia